Mosna may refer to:
Mosna, Serbia, a village in the municipality of Majdanpek, in eastern Serbia
Mosna, Poland, a village in Pomeranian Voivodeship in northern Poland
Moşna (disambiguation), the name of several places in Romania
Mosna, a village in Brabova Commune, Dolj County, Romania
Mosna (surname)